Andrea Belicchi (born 18 December 1976) is an Italian professional racing driver. He has competed in such series as the Porsche Supercup, Le Mans Series and FIA World Endurance Championship.

He won the Russian Formula Three Championship in 2002 and Finnish Formula Three Championship in 2003 with Lukoil Racing and previously the Renault Sport Spider Elf Trophy in 1998. He also competed in Italian Formula 3000 and Formula Renault V6 Eurocup before switching to sports car racing.

He was the GTS class champion in 2006 International GT Open along with Stefano Zonca. Also in 2006 he got a GT2 class win at the 2006 1000 km of Nürburgring on a GPC Ferrari. In 2007 he drove a Spyker at the Le Mans Series. In 2008 he switched to the LMP2 class, finishing second in class at the 1000 km of Catalunya. In 2009 he progressed to the LMP1 class, where he took a 2nd overall finish at the 1000 km of Silverstone.

For the 2010 Le Mans Series, Belicchi switched to Rebellion Racing. Driving a Lola-Judd, he finished third overall at the 2010 8 Hours of Castellet. After several teams defected to the Intercontinental Le Mans Cup, Belicchi took two second-place finishes in the Le Mans Series with Jean-Christophe Boullion as partner, and was runner-up in the LMP1 class.

As the LMP1 class was dropped from the 2012 Le Mans Series program, Belicchi stayed with Rebellion at the new FIA World Endurance Championship, driving a Lola-Toyota with Harold Primat. With two fourth-place finishes at Silverstone and Shanghai, he was 16th in the drivers standings. In 2013, he continued with Rebellion at the LMP1 class, finishing third at Fuji and fourth at Shanghai. In 2014 he finished sixth overall at Bahrain and eighth at Shanghai. With three class wins, he ended as LMP1 Private Teams runner-up behind his teammates.

In 2015, Belicchi switched to touring cars, as he joined the TCR International Series with a SEAT León.

Racing record

Complete 24 Hours of Le Mans results

Complete European Le Mans Series results

Complete FIA World Endurance Championship results

Complete TCR International Series results
(key) (Races in bold indicate pole position) (Races in italics indicate fastest lap)

† Driver did not finish the race, but was classified as he completed over 75% of the race distance.

Complete WeatherTech SportsCar Championship results
(key) (Races in bold indicate pole position; races in italics indicate fastest lap)

† Points only counted towards the Michelin Endurance Cup, and not the overall LMP2 Championship.

References

External links
 
 

1975 births
Living people
Italian racing drivers
Sportspeople from Parma
Formula Renault Eurocup drivers
Russian Formula Three Championship drivers
Auto GP drivers
Formula Renault V6 Eurocup drivers
24 Hours of Le Mans drivers
European Le Mans Series drivers
Porsche Supercup drivers
American Le Mans Series drivers
FIA World Endurance Championship drivers
International GT Open drivers
TCR International Series drivers
WeatherTech SportsCar Championship drivers
Rebellion Racing drivers
Nürburgring 24 Hours drivers